Dverberg is a former municipality in Nordland county, Norway. The administrative centre was the village of Dverberg where Dverberg Church is located. The municipality existed from 1838 until its dissolution in 1964. 

The municipality encompassed areas on the island of Andøya in what is now Andøy Municipality. Upon its dissolution in 1964, the municipality was only .

History

The prestegjeld of Dverberg was established as a municipality on 1 January 1838 (see formannskapsdistrikt).

On 1 January 1924, Dverberg municipality was divided into three.  The northern part of Dverberg became the new municipality of Andenes (population: 2,213) and the southern part of Dverberg was separated to become the new municipality of Bjørnskinn (population: 1,410).  This left 1,477 residents in Dverberg which now only covered the central part of the island of Andøya.

During the 1960s, there were many municipal mergers across Norway due to the work of the Schei Committee.  On 1 January 1964, the neighboring municipalities of Bjørnskinn (population: 1,835), Andenes (population: 3,812), and Dverberg (population: 1,719) were all merged back together again to create the new Andøy Municipality.

Name
The municipality (originally the parish) is named after the old Dverberg farm since the first Dverberg Church was built there. Thus the name is referring to a mountain where dwarfs live.

Government
While it existed, this municipality was responsible for primary education (through 10th grade), outpatient health services, senior citizen services, unemployment, social services, zoning, economic development, and municipal roads. 

During its existence, this municipality was governed by a municipal council of elected representatives, which in turn elected a mayor.

Municipal council
The municipal council  of Dverberg was made up of 15 representatives that were elected to four year terms.  The party breakdown of the final municipal council was as follows:

Notable people
Torstein Raaby (1918-1964), a Norwegian resistance fighter and explorer

See also
List of former municipalities of Norway

References

Andøy
Former municipalities of Norway
1838 establishments in Norway
1964 disestablishments in Norway